The Live One is the title of a live album by folk singer/guitarist Greg Brown. It was recorded at JR's Warehouse, Traverse City, Michigan in June 1994.

Reception

Writing for Allmusic, music critic Richard Meyer wrote of the album "This is very informal recording with bits of tuning and chit-chat. The songs, of course, carry the day."

Track listing
All songs by Greg Brown except as noted.
 "Just by Myself" – 6:49
 "Billy from the Hills" – 6:18
 "Boomtown" – 3:04
 "Spring Wind" – 4:20
 "Laughing River" – 6:22
 "You Drive Me Crazy" – 4:41
 "Canned Goods" – 13:47
 "I Don't Want to Have a Nice Day" – 3:28
 "Brand New '64 Dodge" – 3:04
 "1952 Vincent Black Lightning" (Richard Thompson) – 5:16
 "One More Goodnight Kiss" – 4:53
 "Moondance" (Van Morrison) – 7:22

Personnel
Greg Brown – vocals, guitar
Gary Worden – percussion (on "Moondance")

References

This was recorded by Don Julan in 1992. I was at this show

Greg Brown (folk musician) live albums
1995 live albums
Red House Records albums